Captain America (vol. 5) was an ongoing comic book series published for four years from January 2005 to July 2009 by Marvel Comics. It starred the superhero Captain America, and the entire series was written by Ed Brubaker. It was the fifth Captain America series with this title to be published, following series that ran from 1968–1996, 1996–1997, 1998–2002, and 2002-2004. After its fiftieth issue (July 2009), the series was renumbered to match the numbering of all the volumes of the title (454, 13, 50, 32, and 50), and volume 1 resumed publication with issue #600 with Brubaker remaining as writer.

The series was best known for reviving Captain America's World War II partner Bucky Barnes as the Winter Soldier in issue #6, the presumed death of Steve Rogers in issue #25, and Bucky taking over the mantle of Captain America in issue #34.

History
Captain America vol. 5 ran from Jan. 2005 – Aug. 2011. Beginning with the 600th overall issue (Aug. 2009), Captain America resumed its original numbering, as if the series numbering had continued uninterrupted after #454.

As part of the aftermath of Marvel Comics' company-crossover storyline "Civil War", Steve Rogers was ostensibly killed in Captain America vol. 5, #25 (March 2007). Series writer Ed Brubaker remarked, "What I found is that all the really hard-core left-wing fans want Cap to be standing out on and giving speeches on the street corner against the George W. Bush administration, and all the really right-wing fans all want him to be over in the streets of Baghdad, punching out Saddam Hussein." The character's co-creator, Joe Simon, said, "It's a hell of a time for him to go. We really need him now." Artist Alex Ross designed a slightly revised Captain America costume that former sidekick Bucky Barnes began to wear as the new Captain America in vol. 5, #34 (March 2008). As of 2007, an estimated 210 million copies of "Captain America" comic books had been sold in 75 countries.

The storyline of Rogers' return began in issue #600.

Story arcs 
 "Out of Time" (#1-6)
 "Interlude: The Lonesome Death of Jack Monroe" (#7)
 "The Winter Soldier" (#8-9 & 11-14)
 "House of M" (#10)
 "Red is the Darkest Color" (#15)
 "Collision Courses" (#16-17)
 "Twenty-First Century Blitz" (#18-21)
 "The Drums of War" (#22-24)
 "The Death of Captain America: The Death of the Dream" (#25-30)
 "The Death of Captain America Act Two: The Burden of Dreams" (#31-36)
 "The Death of Captain America Act Three: The Man Who Bought America" (#37-42)
 "Time's Arrow" (#43-45)
 "Old Friends and Enemies" (#46-48)
 "The Daughter of Time" (#49)
 "Days Gone By" (#50)

One-shots 
In addition to the regular series, two one-shot issues written by Ed Brubaker were published in coordination with ongoing stories.
 Captain America 65th Anniversary Special (May 2006) follows up issues 15-17.
 Winter Soldier: Winter Kills (February 2007) takes place at the same time as issues 22-24.

Creators

Writer 
 Ed Brubaker, #1-50

Artists 
 Steve Epting, #1-6, #8, #11-14, #18-21, #25-34, #37-38, #40-42, and #46
 Michael Lark, #2-5, #9, and #12
 John Paul Leon, #7
 Lee Weeks, #10
 Mike Perkins, #15-17, #22-24, #26-30, and #36
 Jackson Guice, #35-36, #45, and #47-48
 Roberto de la Torre, #39
 Luke Ross, #42-45 and #48-50

Collected editions 
 Captain America: Winter Soldier Volume 1 (#1-7) 
 Captain America: Winter Soldier Volume 2 (#8-9 & 11-14) 
 House of M: World of M Featuring Wolverine (#10 and other House of M tie ins) 
 Captain America: Red Menace Volume 1 (#15-17 and Captain America 65th Anniversary Special) 
 Captain America: Red Menace Volume 2 (#18-21) 
 Civil War: Captain America (#22-24 and Winter Soldier: Winter Kills) 
 Captain America: The Death of Captain America Volume 1: The Death of the Dream (#25-30) 
 Captain America: The Death of Captain America Volume 2: The Burden of Dreams (#31-36) 
 Captain America: The Death of Captain America Volume 3: The Man Who Bought America (#37-42) 
 Captain America: The Man With No Face (#43-48) 
 Captain America: Road to Reborn (#49-50 and volume 1 #600-601) 
 Captain America: Two Americas (#602-605 and Captain America: Who Will Wield the Shield?) 
 Captain America: No Escape (#606-610) 
 Captain America: The Trial of Captain America (#611-615 & 615.1) 
 Captain America: Prisoner of War (#616-619)

Ultimate Collections 
 Captain America: Winter Soldier Ultimate Collection (#1-9 & 11-14) 
 Captain America: Red Menace Ultimate Collection (#15-21 and Captain America 65th Anniversary Special) 
 Captain America: The Death of Captain America Ultimate Collection (#22-42 and Winter Soldier: Winter Kills)

Marvel Omnibus 
 Captain America Omnibus Volume 1 (#1-25, Captain America 65th Anniversary Special, and Winter Soldier: Winter Kills) 
 Captain America Omnibus Volume 2: The Death of Captain America (#25-42) 
 Captain America Omnibus Volume 3: Captain America Lives! (#43-50, volume 1 #600-601, and Captain America: Reborn #1-6) 
 Captain America Omnibus Volume 4: The Trial of Captain America ("Captain America: Who Will Wield The Shield? 1", volume 1 #602-610, Steve Rogers: Super Soldier #1-4, volume 1 # 611-619, 615.1, and Captain America (2011) #1-10) 
 Captain America Omnibus Volume 5: Return of the Winter Soldier (Captain America and Bucky #620-628, Fear Itself 7.1: Captain America, Winter Soldier #1-5, Captain America (2011) #11-19, Winter Soldier #6-14)

References

Captain America titles